Panna Airport is an airport that serves the town of Panna, Madhya Pradesh, India. Spread over 106 acres, it is maintained by the Airports Authority of India.

The airport is listed as "non-operational", part of a list of 32 such airports submitted by the then Civil Aviation Minister Praful Patel to the Lok Sabha in 2009, though the Chief Minister of Madhya Pradesh, Shivraj Singh Chouhan had spoken of privatising the airport in 2007.

References

Airports in Madhya Pradesh
Buildings and structures in Madhya Pradesh
Panna, India
Year of establishment missing